Sergej Maslobojev; born 22 May 1987), nicknamed 'Kuvalda' ('Sledgehammer'), is a Lithuanian mixed martial artist, boxer and kickboxer, currently signed with GLORY, where he is the former Glory Light Heavyweight champion. He is ranked as the third best light heavyweight in the world by Combat Press as of September 2022, and third best by Beyond Kick as of October 2022.

Maslobojev is the former two time King of Kings Heavyweight champion.

Personal life
Maslobojev saw kickboxing when he was a child, but only started training at the age of 18. He was impressed by Mirko Filipović, Wanderlei Silva and Remigijus Morkevičius.

He is a professional Kickboxer and previously fought out of Sparta Fight gym in Lithuania, Vilnius city. In 2018 Sergej opened a brand new gym named Champion's House. He now has his own brand "Kuvalda Team". He regularly participates in various charity, being also a member of UNICEF. He undertakes training seminars for members of the Lithuanian Armed Forces.

Maslobojev calls himself "a huge Dragonball Z nerd."

Kickboxing career

Early career
Maslobojev made his professional debut against Steve Hooper in May 2007, when the two fought for the WKA Heavyweight Championship. The fight went into the tenth round, after which Sergej won by knockout. In his next fight, Maslobojev won the Baltic Muay Thai Light Heavyweight title, with a decision win over Kristaps Zile. After defeating Ricardo van den Bos, he entered the 2011 KOK European Heavyweight Grand Prix. He scored a first round knockout of Vasile Popovici in the quarterfinal and a third round knockout of Martynas Knyzelis in the semifinal, and faced Mindaugas Sakalauskas in the finals. Maslobojev beat Sakalauskas by knockout in the fifth round.

Maslobojev went on a 2-2 run over his next four fights, before challenging the reigning WKN Heavyweight champion Vladimir Mineev at Fight Nights: Battle of Moscow 15. Mineev won the fight by majority decision.

King of Kings
For his next fight, Maslbojev was scheduled to fight Lukasz Butkiewicz, at the KOK World GP 2014 in Gdańsk. He won the fight by a second-round knockout. He followed this up with a fight against Pavel Voronin, whom he beat by knockout as well. He would go on to win four of his next five fights, losing only to Roman Kryklia, before fighting Robert Dorin for the KOK Heavyweight Championship. Sergej won the fight by unanimous decision.

After winning the KOK title, Maslobojev went on an eight fight, two year winning streak, during which he earned decision wins over Gokhan Gedik, Oleg Primachev and Thomas Bridgewater, as well as stoppage wins over Antonio Plazibat, Chaiyo Sitteacherjulun, Stanislav Voytenko, Carlos Ulberg and Bruno Susano. This run culminated in a title fight with Stéphane Susperregui for the WAKO World K-1 Heavyweight title. Maslobojev won by a fourth-round TKO, after Susperregui's corner was forced to throw in the towel. This winning streak was ended by Ondrej Hutnik at Yangames Fight Night 5, when the two of them fought for the WKN European Oriental Rules heavyweight title, with Hutnik winning a majority decision.

In his next fight, Maslobojev was scheduled to fight Petros Vardakas. Maslobojev knocked Vardakas out in the second round.

ONE Championship
Following a TKO victory against Noureddine Ajnaou at KOK`55 World Series, Maslobojev signed with ONE Championship. He made his organizational debut at |ONE Championship: Grit and Glory, in a rematch with Antonio Plazibat. Maslobojev won the rematch by unanimous decision. In his second fight with ONE, he fought Florent Kaouachi at ONE Championship: Pursuit of Power, and won by unanimous decision.

Moving away from ONE Championship, Maslobojev earned a unanimous decision against Rafael de Souza and a stoppage win against Fraser Weightman.

GLORY
In the second part of 2019, Maslobojev signed with GLORY. He was scheduled to make his debut against John King at Glory 68. King later withdrew, and Maslobojev was rescheduled to fight Bahram Rajabzadeh at Glory 69: Düsseldorf. He won the fight by unanimous decision.

Maslobojev was next scheduled to fight a rematch with Fraser Weightman at Glory 73. The fight fell through, as Weightman was unable to gain a visa to fight in China. He was next set to face the K-1 heavyweight champion Roel Mannaart at Glory 75: Utrecht. Sergej won the fight by TKO, breaking Roel's jaw in the first round.

Maslobojev was scheduled to fight Luis Tavares at Glory 78: Arnhem. He later withdrew from the bout with an injury.

Maslobojev was scheduled to face Donegi Abena at Glory: Collision 3 on 23 October 2021. He won the fight by split decision.

Maslobojev was scheduled to face Olivier Langlois-Ross at KoK Mega Battle on 20 November 2021. He won the fight by unanimous decision. 

Maslobojev was booked to face Nika Kulumbegashvili at KOK 99 Mega Series on 19 March 2022. He won the fight by unanimous decision.

GLORY Light heavyweight champion
Maslobojev was expected to face the #1 ranked Glory light heavyweight contender Luis Tavares for the vacant Glory Light Heavyweight Championship at Glory 81: Ben Saddik vs. Adegbuy 2 on 20 August 2022. The fight was cancelled on 10 August 2022, due to "reasons on the part of Tavares". Later that day, it was revealed that Tavares had tested positive for performance enhancing drugs. Maslobojev was instead scheduled to face Tarik Khbabez for the vacant title. Maslobojev won the fight by split decision.

Maslobojev made his first title defense against the one-time Glory light heavyweight title challenger Donegi Abena at Glory 83 on February 11, 2023. He lost the fight by a fourth-round technical knockout. The ringside physician stopped the fight due to a cut on Maslobojev's right shin.

Titles

Kickboxing

Professional
 2007 WKA Heavyweight Champion
 2009 Baltic Muay Thai Light Heavyweight Champion
 2011 KOK Europe Heavyweight Grand Prix Winner
 2015 European Union of Martial Sports Kickboxing Light Heavyweight World Champion 
 2015 KOK Light Heavyweight Championship 
 2017 WAKO PRO World K-1 Light Heavyweight Champion
 2022 Glory Light Heavyweight Championship

Amateur
  2012 WAKO European K-1 -91 kg Championship 
  2013 Polish Kickboxing -91 kg Championship 
  2013 WAKO World K-1 -91 kg Championship
  2014 WAKO European K-1 -91 kg Championship
  2018 WAK-1F World K-1 -91 kg Championship
  2019 WAKO World K-1 -91 kg Championship

Boxing
 2012 Bigger's Better 17 Heavyweight Tournament Winner
 2013 Bigger's Better 26 Heavyweight Tournament Winner

Kickboxing record

|- style="background:#fbb;"
| 2023-02-11|| Loss ||align=left| Donegi Abena || Glory 83 || Essen, Germany || TKO (Doctor stoppage) || 4 || 2:15
|-
! style=background:white colspan=9 |

|-  style="background:#cfc;"
| 2022-10-08 || Win ||align=left| Tarik Khbabez || Glory: Collision 4 || Arnhem, Netherlands || Decision (Split) ||  5|| 3:00
|-
! style=background:white colspan=9 |
|- 

|-  style="background:#cfc;"
|2022-03-19
|Win
|align=left| Nika Kulumbegashvili
|KOK 99 Mega Series
|Vilnius, Lithuania
|Decision (Unanimous)
|3
|3:00
|-

|-  style="background:#cfc;"
| 2021-11-20 || Win ||align=left| Olivier Langlois-Ross || KOK 96 Mega Series || Vilnius, Lithuania || Decision (Unanimous) || 3 || 3:00 
|-

|-  style="background:#cfc;"
| 2021-10-23|| Win ||align=left| Donegi Abena || Glory: Collision 3 || Arnhem, Netherlands || Decision (Split) || 3 || 3:00
|-
|- style="background:#cfc;"
|  2020-02-29 || Win || align="left" | Roel Mannaart || Glory 75: Utrecht || Utrecht, Netherlands || TKO (Punches) || 1 || 1:48
|-
|-  bgcolor="#CCFFCC"
| 2019-10-12 || Win ||align=left| Bahram Rajabzadeh  || Glory 69: Düsseldorf || Düsseldorf, Germany || Decision (Unanimous) || 3 || 3:00
|-
|-  bgcolor="#CCFFCC"
| 2019-03-16 || Win ||align=left| Fraser Weightman  || KOK`69 World Series || Vilnius, Lithuania || KO (Left Hook) || 2 || 2:28
|-
|-  bgcolor="#CCFFCC"
| 2018-11-17 || Win ||align=left| Rafael de Souza  || KOK Hero's World Series 2018 || Vilnius, Lithuania || Decision (Unanimous) || 3 || 3:00
|-
|-  bgcolor="#CCFFCC"
| 2018-07-13 || Win ||align=left| Florent Kaouachi  || ONE Championship: Pursuit of Power || Kuala Lumpur, Malaysia || Decision (Unanimous) || 3 || 3:00
|-
|-  bgcolor="#CCFFCC"
| 2018-05-12 || Win ||align=left| Antonio Plazibat  || |ONE Championship: Grit and Glory || Jakarta, Indonesia || Decision (Unanimous) || 3 || 3:00 
|-
|-  bgcolor="#CCFFCC"
| 2018-03-17 || Win ||align=left| Noureddine Ajnaou || KOK`55 World Series || Vilnius, Lithuania || TKO || 1 || 1:36
|-
|-  bgcolor="#CCFFCC"
| 2017-11-18 || Win ||align=left| Petros Vardakas || FightBOX KOK Hero's World Series || Vilnius, Lithuania || KO || 2 || 1:24
|-
|-  bgcolor="#FFBBBB"
| 2017-07-27 || Loss||align=left| Ondrej Hutnik || Yangames Fight Night 5|| Prague, Czech Republic || Decision (Majority) || 3 || 
|-
! style=background:white colspan=9 | For the WKN European Oriental Rules Heavyweight Championship 96.6 kg.
|-
|-  bgcolor="#CCFFCC"
| 2017-06-30 || Win ||align=left| Stéphane Susperregui  || Monte Carlo Fighting Masters || Monte Carlo, Monaco || TKO (Towel Thrown)  || 4 || 
|-
! style=background:white colspan=9 |
|- 
|-  bgcolor="#CCFFCC"
| 2017-03-18 || Win ||align=left| Thomas Bridgewater || KOK'45 WORLD GP 2017 IN VILNIUS|| Vilnius, Lithuania || Decision (Majority) || 4 || 3:00 
|-
|-  bgcolor="#CCFFCC"
| 2016-11-19 || Win ||align=left| Bruno Susano || KOK Hero's World Series In Vilnius|| Vilnius, Lithuania || KO || 2 || 1:49 
|- 
|-  bgcolor="#CCFFCC"
| 2016-09-23 || Win ||align=left| Carlos Ulberg || EM Legend 12 || Chengdu, China || TKO (Low kicks) || 3|| 2:31
|- 
|-  bgcolor="#CCFFCC"
| 2016-08-27 || Win ||align=left| Stanislav Voytenko || Faith Fight Championship || Guangzhou, China || KO (Left hook to the body)|| 2|| 1:00
|- 
|-  bgcolor="#CCFFCC"
| 2016-08-07 || Win ||align=left| Chaiyo Sitteacherjulun || Chalong Boxing Stadium Fight Night|| Phuket, Thailand || KO || 3|| 1:59
|- 
|-  bgcolor="#CCFFCC"
| 2016-06-25 || Win ||align=left| Oleh Pryimachov || FF fighting championship|| Shenzhen, China || Decision (Unanimous) || 3 || 3:00 
|-  bgcolor="#CCFFCC"
| 2016-03-19 || Win ||align=left| Gokhan Gedik || KOK World GP 2016 In Vilnius || Vilnius, Lithuania || Decision (Unanimous) || 3 || 3:00
|-  bgcolor="#CCFFCC"
| 2016-02-19 || Win ||align=left| Antonio Plazibat || FFC22: Athens || Athens, Greece || TKO || 2 || 3:00
|-  bgcolor="#CCFFCC"
| 2015-11-14 || Win ||align=left| Robert Dorin || KOK World GP 2015 In Vilnius - Heavyweight Tournament Final || Vilnius, Lithuania || Decision (Unanimous) || 5 ||3:00
|-
! style=background:white colspan=9 |
|-
|-  bgcolor="#CCFFCC"
| 2015-08-15 || Win ||align=left| Patryk Szychovski || Baltic Summer Fight || Liepāja || TKO || 2|| 1:15
|- 
|-  bgcolor="#FFBBBB"
| 2015-06-07 || Loss||align=left| Roman Kryklia || Kunlun Fight 26 - Super Heavyweight Tournament, Reserve Fight || Chongqing, China || KO (Left Hook) || 3 || 2:56
|-
|-  bgcolor="#CCFFCC"
| 2015-05-15 || Win ||align=left| Kwantong Lion MuayThai || Bangla Stadium || Phuket, Thailand || KO || 1|| 0:37
|-
|-  bgcolor="#CCFFCC"
| 2015-03-14 || Win ||align=left| Kryspin Kalski || KOK World GP 2015 in Vilnius, Semifinals || Vilnius, Lithuania || TKO || 1|| 2:10
|- 
|-  bgcolor="#CCFFCC"
| 2015-02-23 || Win ||align=left| Petr Kareš || Noc Mistrů 9 || Prague, Czech Republic || TKO || 4 || 2:47
|-
! style=background:white colspan=9 |
|-
|-  bgcolor="#CCFFCC"
| 2014-11-15 || Win ||align=left| Pavel Voronin || Bushido Series - Hero's KOK -91 kg || Vilnius, Lithuania || KO ||2 || 
|-
|-  bgcolor="#CCFFCC"
| 2014-10-17 ||Win ||align=left| Lukasz Butkiewicz  || KOK World GP 2014 in Gdańsk || Gdańsk, Poland || TKO || 2 ||1:09 
|-
|-  bgcolor="#FFBBBB"
| 2014-03-28 || Loss||align=left| Vladimir Mineev || Fight Nights: Battle of Moscow 15 || Moscow, Russia || Decision (Majority) || 5 || 3:00
|-
! style=background:white colspan=9 |
|- 
|-  bgcolor="#CCFFCC"
| 2014-02-23 || Win ||align=left| Martynas Knyzelis || Big Fight || Kaunas, Lithuania || TKO || 2 || N/A
|-
|-  bgcolor="#FFBBBB"
| 2013-03-30 || Loss||align=left| Nicolas Wamba || || Agde, France || Decision || 5 || 2:00
|-
|-  bgcolor="#FFBBBB"
| 2012-03-23 || Loss ||align=left| Ali Cenik || United Glory 15 || Moscow, Russia || Decision || 3 || 3:00
|-
|-  bgcolor="#CCFFCC"
| 2012-01-20 || Win ||align=left| Janis Ginters || Fight night in Klaipėda || Klaipėda, Lithuania || Decision ||  || 
|-
|-  bgcolor="#CCFFCC"
| 2011-03-19 || Win ||align=left| Mindaugas Sakalauskas || KING OF KINGS EUROPE GP 2011 IN VILNIUS, Final || Vilnius, Lithuania || KO (Punches) || 5 || 1:48
|-
! style=background:white colspan=9 |
|-  bgcolor="#CCFFCC"
| 2011-03-19 || Win ||align=left| Martynas Knyzelis || KING OF KINGS EUROPE GP 2011 IN VILNIUS, Semifinals || Vilnius, Lithuania || KO (Right straight) || 3 || N/A
|-
|-  bgcolor="#CCFFCC"
| 2011-03-19 || Win ||align=left| Vasile Popovici || KING OF KINGS EUROPE GP 2011 IN VILNIUS, Quarterfinals || Vilnius, Lithuania || KO (Right hook) || 1 || 0:11
|-
|-  bgcolor="#CCFFCC"
| 2010-04-10 || Win ||align=left| Ricardo van den Bos || K-1 WORLD GP 2010 in Vilnius || Vilnius, Lithuania || Decision || 3 || 3:00
|-
|-  bgcolor="#CCFFCC"
| 2009-10-24 || Win ||align=left| Kristaps Zile || K-1 EJSL || Riga, Latvia || Decision || 5 || 3:00
|-
! style=background:white colspan=9 |
|-
|-  bgcolor="#CCFFCC"
| 2007-05-26 || Win ||align=left| Steve Hooper || W.K.A || England || KO || 10 || 2:10
|-
! style=background:white colspan=9 |
|-

Amateur record

|-  bgcolor="#CCFFCC"
| 2019-10- || Win ||align=left| Roman Shcherbatiuk || W.A.K.O World Championships 2019, K-1 Final -91 kg  || Sarajevo, Bosnia and Herzegovina || Decision || 3 || 2:00
|-
! style=background:white colspan=9 | 
|-  bgcolor="#CCFFCC"
| 2019-10- || Win ||align=left| Cemil Yildrim || W.A.K.O World Championships 2019, K-1 Semi Final -91 kg  || Sarajevo, Bosnia and Herzegovina || Decision || 3 || 2:00
|-  bgcolor="#CCFFCC"
| 2019-10- || Win ||align=left| Toni Capitovic || W.A.K.O World Championships 2019, K-1 Quarter Finals -91 kg  || Sarajevo, Bosnia and Herzegovina || Decision || 3 || 2:00
|-  bgcolor="#CCFFCC"
| 2019-10- || Win ||align=left| Adrian Bartl || W.A.K.O World Championships 2019, K-1 Round of 16 –91 kg  || Sarajevo, Bosnia and Herzegovina || Decision || 3 || 2:00
|-
|-  bgcolor="#CCFFCC"
| 2018-10-07 || Win ||align=left| Jaroslav Linic || WAK-1F, K-1 Final +91 kg  || Riga, Latvia || KO (Injury)|| 1 || 00:50
|-
! style=background:white colspan=9 | 
|-
|-  bgcolor="#CCFFCC"
| 2018-10-06 || Win ||align=left| Karapetyan Markos || WAK-1F, K-1 Semi-Final +91 kg  || Riga, Latvia || TKO (Injury)|| 1 || 00:00
|-
|-  bgcolor="#CCFFCC"
| 2014-10 || Win ||align=left| Petr Kares || W.A.K.O European Championships 2014, K-1 Final -91 kg  || Bilbao, Spain || Decision (Unanimous)|| 3 || 2:00
|-
! style=background:white colspan=9 | 
|-
|-  bgcolor="#CCFFCC"
| 2014-10 || Win ||align=left| Piotr Ramankevich || W.A.K.O European Championships 2014, K-1 Semifinals -91 kg  || Bilbao, Spain || Decision (Unanimous)|| 3 || 2:00
|-
|-  bgcolor="#CCFFCC"
| 2014-10-23 || Win ||align=left| Bojan Džepina || W.A.K.O European Championships 2014, K-1 Quarterfinals -91 kg  || Bilbao, Spain || TKO (Cut) || 3 || 
|-
|-  bgcolor="#FFBBBB"
| 2014-05-03 || Loss ||align=left| Dzianis Hancharonak || 2014 IFMA World Championships -91 kg  || Langkawi, Malaysia || TKO (Injury) ||  || 
|-
|-  bgcolor="#CCFFCC"
| 2013-10 || Win ||align=left| Alex Pereira || W.A.K.O World Championships 2013, K-1 Final -91 kg  || Guaruja, Brasil || Decision ||  || 
|-
! style=background:white colspan=9 |
|-
|-  bgcolor="#CCFFCC"
| 2013-10 || Win ||align=left| Andrey Khlynovskii || W.A.K.O World Championships 2013, K-1 Semifinals -91 kg  || Guaruja, Brasil ||  ||  || 
|-
|-  bgcolor="#CCFFCC"
| 2013-10 || Win ||align=left| Petr Kares || W.A.K.O World Championships 2013, K-1 Quarterfinals -91 kg  || Guaruja, Brasil ||  ||  || 
|-
|-  bgcolor="#CCFFCC"
| 2013-04-25 || Win ||align=left| Mindaugas Sakalauskas || Vilnius Open 2013  || Vilnius, Lithuania || Decision || 3 || 3:00
|-
|-  bgcolor="#CCFFCC"
| 2013-04-14 || Win ||align=left| Tomasz Klimiuk || Kickboxing Championships in Poland, K-1 Final +91 kg || Starachowice, Poland || TKO || 2 || 
|-
! style=background:white colspan=9 |
|-
|-  bgcolor="#CCFFCC"
| 2013-04-13 || Win ||align=left| Wojciech Jastrzepski || Kickboxing Championships in Poland, K-1 Semifinals +91 kg || Starachowice, Poland ||  ||  || 
|-
|-  bgcolor="#CCFFCC"
| 2013-04-13 || Win ||align=left| Maciej Medynski || Kickboxing Championships in Poland, K-1 Quarterfinals +91 kg || Starachowice, Poland ||  ||  || 
|-
|-  bgcolor="#FFBBBB"
| 2012-11 || Loss||align=left| Vladimir Mineev || W.A.K.O European Championships 2012, K-1 Final -91 kg  || Ankara, Turkey || TKO (Injury) || 1 || 0:00
|-
! style=background:white colspan=9 |
|-
|-  bgcolor="#CCFFCC"
| 2012-11 || Win ||align=left| Anar Mammadov || W.A.K.O European Championships 2012, K-1 Semifinals -91 kg  || Ankara, Turkey || KO ||  || 
|-
|-  bgcolor="#CCFFCC"
| 2012-11 || Win ||align=left| Petr Kares || W.A.K.O European Championships 2012, K-1 Quarterfinals -91 kg  || Ankara, Turkey || Decision || 3 || 2:00
|-
|-
| colspan=9 | Legend:

Mixed martial arts record

|-
| Win 
| align=center| 11–6
| Nicolai Garbuz
| TKO
| MMA Bushido 77 - Fighting Championship in Vilnius
|  
| align=center| 1
| align=center| 
| Vilnius, Lithuania
| 
|-
| Win 
| align=center| 10–6
| Alexei Gureev
| KO (punch)
| VFC - Verdict Fighting Championship 1
|  
| align=center| 1
| align=center| 3:44
| Moscow, Russia 
| 
|-
| Win 
| align=center| 9–6
| Rimgaudas Kutkaitis
| Submission (armbar)
| RF 6 - Real Fights 6
|  
| align=center| 1
| align=center| 1:24
| Vilnius, Lithuania 
| 
|-
| Win 
| align=center| 8–6
| Valdas Pocevicius
| Decision (unanimous)
| RF 6 - Real Fights 6
|  
| align=center| 3
| align=center| 5:00
| Vilnius, Lithuania 
| 
|-
| Loss
| align=center| 7–6
| Jeff Monson
| Submission (north-south choke)
| CW 11 - Decade
|  
| align=center| 2
| align=center| 1:30
| Belfast, Northern Ireland 
| 
|-
| Win 
| align=center| 7–5
| Colin Laird
| KO (knee and punches)
| Cage Rage Contenders - Ireland vs. Belgium
|  
| align=center| 1
| align=center| N/A
| Dublin, Ireland 
| 
|-
| Win 
| align=center| 6–5
| Szilvester Silbont
| Submission (rear-naked choke)
| CFC 2 - Cage Fighters Championships 2
|  
| align=center| 1
| align=center| 3:48
| London, England, United Kingdom 
| 
|-
| Win 
| align=center| 5–5
| Colin Sexton
| Submission (heel hook)
| GR 23 - Goshin Ryu 23 
|  
| align=center| 1
| align=center| 3:20
| England, United Kingdom
| 
|-
| Loss
| align=center| 4–5
| Bruno Carvalho
| DQ (illegal kick)
| The Zone FC - The Zone
|  
| align=center| 3
| align=center| 1:30
| Stockholm, Sweden 
| 
|-
| Win 
| align=center| 4–4
| Tim McCrory
| Submission (guillotine choke)
| MPR 1 - Money Power Respect 1
|  
| align=center| 1
| align=center| 1:36
| England, United Kingdom
| 
|-
| Win 
| align=center| 3–4
| Dave Daubney
| KO (knees)
| GR 22 - Goshin Ryu 22
|  
| align=center| 1
| align=center| 2:09
| England, United Kingdom
| 
|-
| Win 
| align=center| 2–4
| Kevin Thompson
| Submission (kimura)
| WIW 4 - War in Workington 4
|  
| align=center| 2
| align=center| N/A
| Cumbria, England, United Kingdom
| 
|-
| Loss
| align=center| 1–4
| Romualds Garkulis
| Submission (armbar)
| WFCA - Gladiators Fight 8
|  
| align=center| N/A
| align=center| N/A
| Riga, Latvia
| 
|-
| Loss
| align=center| 1–3
| Michael Ettl
| Submission (armbar)
| CFS 1 - Cage Fight Series 1
|  
| align=center| 1 
| align=center| 3:08 
| Graz, Austria 
| 
|-
| Loss
| align=center| 1–2
| Atte Backman
| TKO 
| FF 18 - Fight Festival 18 
|  
| align=center| 1 
| align=center| 2:25 
| Helsinki, Finland 
| 
|-
| Loss
| align=center| 1–1
| Andrejs Zozulja
| Submission (guillotine choke)
| WFCA - Gladiators Fight 5 
|  
| align=center| 1 
| align=center| 0:45 
| Riga, Latvia
| 
|-
| Win 
| align=center| 1–0
| Raymond Mihalyov
| Submission (armbar)
| WFCA - Gladiators Fight 2 
|  
| align=center| 1
| align=center| 2:07 
| Riga, Latvia 
|

Professional boxing record

See also
 List of male kickboxers

External links
 Profile at Glory

References 

1987 births
Living people
Lithuanian male kickboxers
Lithuanian male mixed martial artists
Mixed martial artists utilizing boxing
Mixed martial artists utilizing Muay Thai
Lithuanian Muay Thai practitioners
People from Klaipėda
Lithuanian male boxers
Kunlun Fight kickboxers
Glory kickboxers
ONE Championship kickboxers
Heavyweight kickboxers
King of Kings champions